Church and 27th Street is a light rail stop on the Muni Metro J Church line, located in the Noe Valley neighborhood of San Francisco, California. The station opened with the line on August 11, 1917. The stop has no platforms, trains stop at marked poles before the crossing 27th Street and passengers cross a vehicle travel lanes on Church Street to board trains. The stop is not accessible to people with disabilities.

The stop is also served by the  route which provides service along the J Church line during the early morning when trains do not operate.

In March 2014, Muni released details of the proposed implementation of their Transit Effectiveness Project (later rebranded MuniForward), which included a variety of stop changes for the J Church line. Under that plan, bulb-outs would be built to serve as platforms for the stop. A more limited preliminary project announced in November 2019 will include some modifications to the stop.

References

External links 
SFMTA – Church St and 27th St inbound and outbound
SFBay Transit (unofficial) – Church St & 27th St

Muni Metro stations